"Our Winter Love" is an instrumental composition by Johnny Cowell, which was a hit single for Bill Pursell. Pursell's version was recorded in 1962, and was released as a single in January 1963.

Bill Pursell version
While the Bill Pursell version is largely an instrumental, primarily piano with strings, some riffs are vocalized by a chorus of female and male singers. While it wasn't intended to be a Christmas song, some easy listening and adult contemporary radio stations have the Bill Pursell version on their Christmas music playlists.

Chart performance
"Our Winter Love" spent 14 weeks on the Billboard Hot 100 chart in 1963, peaking at No. 9 on March 30, while reaching No. 4 on Billboards Middle-Road Singles chart, No. 20 on Billboards Hot R&B Singles chart, No. 12 in Australia, and No. 25 on Canada's CHUM Hit Parade. Bill Pursell's version was ranked No. 54 on Billboards end of year ranking "Top Records of 1963".

The Lettermen version
In 1966, The Lettermen released a version, with lyrics written by Bob Tubert.  This vocal version spent 4 weeks on the Billboard Hot 100 chart in 1967, peaking at No. 72, while reaching No. 16 on Billboards Easy Listening chart, No. 12 on Record Worlds "Top Non-Rock" chart, and No. 91 on Canada's "RPM 100".

Other versions
In 1963, a version by Lawrence Welk and His Orchestra, was released as the lead track on his album 1963's Early Hits.

References

1963 songs
1963 singles
Columbia Records singles
The Lettermen songs
1960s instrumentals
Songs written by Johnny Cowell
Song recordings produced by Don Law